Lieutenant-General William Smelt, CB (c.1788 – 10 January 1858) was the 18th General Officer Commanding, Ceylon. He was a member of the Smelt family.

He joined the British Army as a Cornet in 1798. In 1814, as a Major of the 103rd Foot, he participated in the battles of Plattsburg, Oswego and Lundy's Lane in North America and was badly wounded at the Siege of Fort Erie.

He was awarded CB in 1826, when a Lieutenant-Colonel of the 41st Foot.
He was appointed General Officer Commanding, Ceylon on 28 January 1847 and succeeded by P. Bainbrigge in 1852. He was awarded the Army of India Medal.

In 1850 he was given the colonelcy of the 62nd (Wiltshire) Regiment of Foot but transferred in 1851 to the 37th Foot, a position he held until his death.  He was promoted Lieutenant-General on 11 November 1851.

References

|-

|-

General Officers Commanding, Ceylon
British Army generals
1858 deaths
British Army personnel of the War of 1812
41st Regiment of Foot officers